Justin Pierce is an American politician and a former Republican member of the Arizona House of Representatives, representing District 25 for one term.

Education
Pierce earned his BS in accountancy from Arizona State University and his JD from Georgetown University Law Center.

Elections
 2014 Pierce lost in the Republican primary for Arizona Secretary of State to Michele Reagan.
 2012 With incumbent Republican Representatives Peggy Judd not running, and David Stevens redistricted to District 14, Pierce was one of two candidates for the August 28, 2012 Republican Primary, placing first with 19,868 votes, and won the first seat in the three-way November 6, 2012 General election with 50,017 votes against Democratic nominee David Butler.

References

External links
 Official page at the Arizona State Legislature
 Campaign site
 

Place of birth missing (living people)
Year of birth missing (living people)
Living people
Ira A. Fulton Schools of Engineering alumni
Georgetown University Law Center alumni
Republican Party members of the Arizona House of Representatives
Politicians from Mesa, Arizona